The Final Sanction is a 1990 film, directed by David A. Prior and starring Ted Prior, Robert Z'Dar and William Smith.

Plot
The United States and Russia have had a nuclear exchange, wiping out most of humanity in the process. In order to decide a winner without any further bombing, the nations both decide to choose their best soldier and let them fight in a restricted area in Virginia. The result of the duel will decide the winner of the war.

Sergeant Tom Batanic (Ted Prior) and Sergei (Robert Z'Dar) fight mercilessly, but at the end they realize the futility of their duel and agree to end it, just as the U.S. general in charge decides to explode the building they are in. It turns out that the whole affair was just a secret agreement between the American and Russian general to let the world realize that in a war, no one is a winner. However, Tom and Sergei survive the explosion, the American general is arrested by the FBI.

Reception
Talking Pulp said that the film "should be ran[sic] through the Cinespiria Shitometer", while The Action Elite said it " is a cool concept with some entertaining action scenes but it does feel like a missed opportunity with a lame ending."

References

External links
 
 
 

1990 films
Films shot in Mobile, Alabama
1990 thriller films
Films directed by David A. Prior
1990s English-language films